Jonathan Johnson may refer to:

Jonathan Johnson (baseball) (born 1974), former Major League Baseball pitcher
Jonathan Johnson (runner) (born 1982), United States at the 2004 Summer Olympics
Jonathan Johnson (ice hockey) (born 1993), Swedish ice hockey forward
Jonathan G. A. Johnson (born 1976), Island Governor of Saba
Jonathan E. Johnson, Republican candidate for Utah Governor and CEO of Overstock.com
Jonathan Eastman Johnson (1824–1906), American painter and co-founder of the Metropolitan Museum of Art
Jon Johnson (born 1954), American sound editor for feature film and television

See also
Jon Jonsson (disambiguation)
John Johnson (disambiguation)